Dorcadion condensatum is a species of beetle in the family Cerambycidae. It was described by Küster in 1852. It is known from Turkey and Bulgaria.

References

condensatum
Beetles described in 1852